SS5 may refer to:
 SS-5 Skean, a Soviet theatre ballistic missile
 Signaling System No. 5, a multi-frequency telephone signalling system
 SPARCstation 5, a workstation produced by Sun Microsystems
 , a submarine of the United States Navy
 Form SS-5 of the Social Security Administration of the federal government of the United States, "Application for a Social Security Number Card"